"On the Radio" is the second single from the album 21st Century by German trance group Groove Coverage.

The song is a cover of "Mann im Mond" by the German acapella/pop group Die Prinzen.

Remix list

"On the Radio" (Radio Version) – 2:58	
"On the Radio" (Club Mix) – 5:28	
"On the Radio" (Extended Version) – 5:22
"On the Radio" (Age Pee RMX) – 5:47	
"On the Radio" (Groove Agents RMX) – 6:30	
"On the Radio" (Karaoke Version) – 3:02

Chart positions

References

Groove Coverage songs
2006 songs